The Rowing Competition at the 1979 Mediterranean Games was held in Zaton near Šibenik.

Medalists

Medal table

References
1979 Mediterranean Games report at the International Committee of Mediterranean Games (CIJM) website

M
Sports at the 1979 Mediterranean Games
 
Rowing competitions in Greece